The vz. 38 is a semi-automatic pistol manufactured from 1939 to 1945 and chambered in .380 ACP (in Europe called 9×17mm Browning Short). The barrel is attached to the frame by a hinge, allowing for very easy disassembly. Certain aspects of the pistol are covered by Czechoslovakian patent 65558 which may also be found as Finnish patent FI18533(A) from 1939.

The pistol was never used by the Czechoslovak military, as the vz. 38 orders were not yet delivered when Germany occupied Czechoslovakia in 1938. Several vz. 38s, modified to have a manual safety, were exported to Bulgaria before the German occupation. Most of the pistols saw service in Greater German police and security forces, and despite several issues the vz. 38 was still in production until 1945. Some were captured used by Yugoslav partisans.

See also 

 Weapons of Czechoslovakia interwar period

Users  

 - 1,700 pistols bought from Germany in 1940.

References

External links
English translation from a Czech book about CZ vzor 38 pistols

.380 ACP semi-automatic pistols
Semi-automatic pistols of Czechoslovakia
World War II infantry weapons
Military equipment introduced in the 1930s